is a Japanese footballer currently playing as a midfielder for Thespakusatsu Gunma.

Career statistics

Club
.

Notes

References

External links

2001 births
Living people
Association football people from Saitama Prefecture
Japanese footballers
Association football midfielders
J2 League players
J3 League players
Thespakusatsu Gunma players
AC Nagano Parceiro players